Govindachandra (reigned 1020–1045) was the last kayastha ruler of the Chandra dynasty in eastern Bengal.

History
According to the Tirumalai inscription, during his reign, the kingdom faced a massive invasion by the Chola king, Rajendra Chola I between 1021–1024 CE. In the inscription he was identified as Govindachandra of Vangaladesa.

In early 1049 CE, the Kalachuri king, Karnadeva (reigned 1042–1072) also launched an attack on Govindachandra (which may have been the downfall of the Chandra dynasty). According to Bengali folk ballads, Govichandra gave up his crown to live the rest of his life as an ascetic.

References 

Chandra kings